Leading lines may refer to:

 Lines that lead to the main subject of a visual composition
 Range markers which visually aid piloting in channels and rivers